Daniel Lyle Cheever (born 1963) is a United States Navy rear admiral who serves as chief of staff of the North American Aerospace Defense Command and United States Northern Command since August 26, 2022. He most recently served as the Director of Plans, Policy, and Strategy of the North American Aerospace Defense Command and United States Northern Command from July 15, 2020, to July 29, 2022. He previously served as the Commander of Carrier Strike Group 4. Raised in Downers Grove, Illinois, Cheever earned a Bachelor of Business degree from Western Illinois University in 1986. He joined the Navy in 1988 and, after flight training, was designated a naval aviator in 1990.

References

External links

1963 births
Living people
Place of birth missing (living people)
People from Downers Grove, Illinois
Western Illinois University alumni
United States Naval Aviators
Recipients of the Air Medal
Recipients of the Legion of Merit
United States Navy admirals
Military personnel from Illinois